The Abujhmad Peace Marathon is a joint initiative of the Narayanpur Police and the District Administration to foster peace and harmony in the maoist hit tribal area of Chhattisgarh

Started in the year 2019, it is a 21 kilometre half marathon. The course of Abujhmad Peace Marathon begins from the High School Grounds at Narayanpur and ends at village Basingbahar, ITBP camp in Orchha block of the district. It is generally held in the months of January or February.every year. It is the largest sports event of the Bastar area. Bicycle rallies and wall painting competitions are organised to promote the Marathon amongst the locals.

The fourth season of the Marathon was held on 27th March 2022.

Past Results

References

External links 
Abujhmad Marathon

Marathons in Asia
Marathons in India